Heungdeok of Silla (777–836) (r. 826–836) was the 42nd ruler of the Korean kingdom of Silla.  He was the younger brother of King Heondeok.  He was married to Queen Jeongmok, the daughter of King Soseong.

Upon rising to the throne, Heungdeok made Kim Yu-jing his prime minister (sijung) and appointed Jang Bogo to the command of the Cheonghae Garrison.  Jang later used this as a basis for dominating Silla politics through the mid-9th century.

In 834, the king revised the colors of official dress. The same year, he also prohibited certain styles of clothing (including extravagant clothing of the Court of Silla, which had been made extravagant under the influence and adoption of Tang dynasty attire; banbi, a short-sleeved garment which had been introduced from the Tang dynasty in the times of Kim Chunchu) and strictly regulated the clothing (21 clothing items, which including the official's hat bokdu (幞頭)) and use of textiles according to a person's golpum.  He also issued an edict forbidding "excessive luxuries" to the common people. He also issued the ban edicts of gold and silver ware even for people who held the status of jingol, only allowing the use of silver-plated ware; thus intending to return to the time (mid-Silla period) when the royalty of Silla had the monopoly over gold and silver ware.  

In 836, Heungdeok died without an heir.  He was buried in the north of Angang-hyeon, now Angang-eup, Gyeongju-si, South Korea.

Family
Grandfather: Wonseong of Silla
Grandmother: Queen Kim (Lady Yeonhwa)(숙정부인 김씨), of the Kim clan, the daughter of
Father: Prince Hyechung (혜충태자) (750–791/792), posthumously named King Hyechung (혜충왕)
Mother: Queen Seongmok, of the Kim clan ( 성목태후 김씨)
Wife:
Queen Jeongmok,of the Kim clan (정목왕후 김씨), known as Madan Janhwa (귀승부인) the daughter of King Soseong.

See also
Unified Silla
List of Korean monarchs
List of Silla people

References

Silla rulers
777 births
836 deaths
Year of birth unknown
8th-century Korean people
9th-century Korean monarchs